Anthony Edward Charles Rayner (born 19 November 1952) is a New Zealand musician who spent twelve years as a keyboardist in the band Split Enz. He has also played in the groups Orb, Space Waltz, Crowded House, The Makers, The Angels in 1986-1987 and 801.

Biography 
Rayner was born in Lower Hutt, New Zealand in 1952.

Rayner has released two solo albums. The first, Horse, was an instrumental offering released in 1995, recorded entirely at Rayner's home studio in Melbourne, Australia. The second was entitled Play it Straight, a play on a Philip Judd Split Enz song called Play it Strange that was a particular favourite of Rayner's during the mid- to late-1970s. The song was not released at the time, but was played live when Judd rejoined the band in 1977. Play it Straight consisted of re-arranged and re-recorded versions of material gleaned from other New Zealand composers.

Rayner's keyboard talents were a notable part of the Split Enz sound. Paul McCartney caught one of their shows in 1979 and became a fan of the band, eventually inviting Rayner to play keyboards on his sixth solo album, Press to Play, which was released in 1986. Rayner has also produced material for many artists including Models, Margaret Urlich, Rikki Morris, Margot Smith, and The Exponents, as well as two Enzso recordings with Split Enz members, Dame Kiri Te Kanawa and the New Zealand Symphony Orchestra.

During the late 1990s Eddie Rayner decided to take the Split Enz songs to an orchestral setting. This sparked the idea for the Enzso project. Along with his synth, the New Zealand Symphony Orchestra, some Newland Singers and some former members of Split Enz, he created orchestral versions for Split Enz songs. The project ended between late 1999 and early 2000.

Recently he has acted as Musical Director for television show New Zealand Idol, and participated in reunions of Split Enz and Space Waltz.  He is also a member of the 1960s cover band The Con-Rays. Another ensemble Eddie has been jamming and recording with is Double Life. The members of Double Life, other than Rayner are (sax, flute and clarinet) Mark Dennison, (drummer) Patrick Kuhtze and (guitarist) Adrian Stuckey.

The current project Eddie Rayner has been an integral part of is Forenzics. A unique collaboration with Tim Finn. Eddie and Tim have combined songs they created using 'shades and echoes' from early Split Enz songs as well as songs created from jams Eddie did with Double Life. The combination of these collaborations are included on the debut Forenzics album 'Shades and Echoes' (Warner Music).

The album was released in early February 2022 nd has received very favourable reviews and response from media and music fans here there and everywhere.

Rayner has performed Split Enz songs along with other ex-Split Enz members, such as a 2013 tour that included other ex-members Mike Chunn, Geoff Chunn, Emlyn Crowther, and Wally Wilkinson. Vocalists on that tour included The X Factor victor Jackie Thomas, contestant Tom Batchelor, and guest vocalists Annie Crummer, Rima Te Wiata, Rikki Morris and Jesse Sheehan.

Eddie's son Harley Rayner is a member of dub band Mt Eden.

Instruments

During the career of Split Enz, Rayner used a wide, changing array of keyboards. In the band's early progressive rock incarnation keyboards he used included a Mellotron, but his mainstays during the band's most popular phase were a Yamaha CP-80 electro-acoustic piano, a Yamaha CS-80 synthesizer and a Prophet 5. When he played keyboards for Crowded House on tour during the late 1980s, he was seen to be using a Yamaha DX7 and a Yamaha Clavinova. Later, when touring with the Enz for reunions Eddie used a Yamaha Motif, Ensoniq TS12 and a Clavia Nord Wave.

See also
 Grand Central Band

External links
 Myspace page

References

 Chunn, Mike, Stranger Than Fiction: The Life and Times of Split Enz, GP Publications, 1992. 
 Chunn, Mike, Stranger Than Fiction: The Life and Times of Split Enz, (revised, ebook edition), Hurricane Press, 2013. 
 Bourke, Chris, Something So Strong, Macmillan Australia, 1997, 
 Dix, John, Stranded in Paradise: New Zealand Rock and Roll, 1955 to the Modern Era, Penguin Books, 2005, 
Eddie Rayner Bio
Enzso project
Eddie Rayner's Official Website

1952 births
Living people
Crowded House members
Split Enz members
New Zealand Idol
People from Wellington City
New Zealand songwriters
Male songwriters
New Zealand keyboardists
New Zealand expatriates in Australia
New Zealand expatriates in England
20th-century New Zealand musicians